Baring is a surname. Notable people with the surname include:

Baring family, a German-British banking family
Alexander Baring, 1st Baron Ashburton (1774–1848), British banker
Alexander Baring, 4th Baron Ashburton (1835–1889), British landowner and politician
Arnulf Baring (1932–2019), German historian
Bingham Baring, 2nd Baron Ashburton (1799–1864)
Charles Baring (1807–1879), Bishop of Durham 
Charles Baring, 2nd Baron Howick of Glendale (born 1937), English horticulturalist
Edward Baring, 1st Baron Revelstoke (1828–1897), British banker
Evelyn Baring, 1st Earl of Cromer (1841–1917), British colonial administrator
Evelyn Baring, 1st Baron Howick of Glendale (1903–1973), Governor of Kenya
Sir Francis Baring, 1st Baronet (1740–1810), English merchant banker who established merchant house of Barings
Francis Baring, 1st Baron Northbrook (1796–1866), British Whig politician, First Lord of the Admiralty
Francis Baring, 6th Baron Northbrook (born 1954), British peer and Conservative politician
Fred Baring (1890–1961), Australian rules footballer
Georg Baring (Baron Georg von Baring) (1773–1848), Hanoverian officer in the King's German Legion  
Giles Baring (1910–1986), English cricketer
Guy Baring (1873–1916), British MP and army officer
Henry Bingham Baring (1804–1869), British Conservative MP
John Baring (1730–1816), merchant, banker and MP
James Baring, 6th Baron Revelstoke (born 1938)
John Baring, 7th Baron Ashburton (1928–2020), British merchant banker and former Chairman of BP
Mark Baring, 8th Baron Ashburton (born 1958), British businessman
Maurice Baring (1874–1945), English man of letters
Norah Baring (1907–1985), British movie actress
Rowland Baring, 2nd Earl of Cromer (1877–1953), English Lord Chamberlain
Rowland Baring, 3rd Earl of Cromer (1918–1991), British Ambassador to US and Governor of the Bank of England
Sarah Baring (1920-2013), English socialite and Bletchley Park linguist 
Thomas Baring (1799–1873), English banker and Conservative MP
Thomas Charles Baring (1831–1891), British banker and Conservative MP
Thomas Baring, 1st Earl of Northbrook (1826–1904), British Viceroy of India and politician
Walter S. Baring Jr. (1911–1975), United States Representative from Nevada